San Fernando District is one of nine districts of the province Rioja in Peru.

References